Iskra Peak is the partly ice-free peak rising to 1018 m in the southeast foothills of Forbidden Plateau on Oscar II Coast in Graham Land.  It surmounts Paspal Glacier to the west and south, and one of its tributaries to the east.  Named after the settlements of Iskra in Northern, Northeastern, Southeastern and Southern Bulgaria.

Location
British mapping in 1978.

Maps
 British Antarctic Territory.  Scale 1:200000 topographic map.  DOS 610 Series, Sheet W 64 60.  Directorate of Overseas Surveys, Tolworth, UK, 1978.
 Antarctic Digital Database (ADD). Scale 1:250000 topographic map of Antarctica. Scientific Committee on Antarctic Research (SCAR). Since 1993, regularly upgraded and updated.

Notes

References
 Iskra Peak. SCAR Composite Antarctic Gazetteer.
 Bulgarian Antarctic Gazetteer. Antarctic Place-names Commission. (details in Bulgarian, basic data in English)

Mountains of Graham Land
Oscar II Coast
Bulgaria and the Antarctic